George Torchinava (born 6 July 1974) is a Dutch wrestler. He competed in the men's freestyle 97 kg at the 2000 Summer Olympics.

References

 

1974 births
Living people
Dutch male sport wrestlers
Olympic wrestlers of the Netherlands
Wrestlers at the 2000 Summer Olympics
Sportspeople from Tbilisi